Dominique Julia (born 1940) is a 20th-21st-century French historian. He is mainly interested in the periods of the Ancien Régime and the French Revolution, as well as the history of religions and the history of education.

Parcours 
Dominique Julia is a former student of the École normale supérieure (class 1960 Lettres) and agrégé d'histoire.

He was research director at the CNRS and has taught at the European University Institute at Florence.

Publications (selection) 
1988: L'éducation des ecclésiastiques aux XVIIe et XVIIIe siècles (article) on Persée
1991:  Enfance et citoyenneté. Bilan historiographique et perspectives de recherches sur l'éducation et l'enseignement pendant la période révolutionnaire. (Deuxième partie) (article) on Persée
2000: BOUTRY Philippe, JULIA Dominique (s.d.), Pèlerins et pèlerinages dans l’Europe moderne, École française de Rome, Paris : Éditions de Boccard, 519 p.
2016: Le Voyage aux saints. Les pèlerinages dans l'Occident moderne (XVe-XVIIIe siècle), Paris, Éditions du Seuil, 384 p.

References

External links 
 List of publications on CAIRN
 Presentation on MEET
 Dominique Julia on France Culture
 Dominique Julia on IESR

20th-century French historians
French historians of religion
École Normale Supérieure alumni
1940 births
Living people